Santiago Santos Muñoz (born in Madrid, on 11 October 1961) is a Spanish former rugby union player and currently coach of the Spain national rugby union team since 2013.

Playing career
Santos made his debut for Real Canoe N.C. at the age of 18 years. In 1984, many players left the club and went to Liceo Francés, where he played for the rest of his career, initially in the second division, and finally in the top category. That Liceo team finished runner-up in the 1990–91 and 1992-93 seasons, and runner-up in 1988-89 Copa del Rey. Santos arrived to Alcalá de Henares almost by chance. His life brought him to England to teach at Instituto Español in London for six years. That adventure in London brought him to retire in the amateur teams of the professional London side Wasps RFC.

International career
As a Spanish international, he debuted at the age of 18, in the test match against Sweden in Uppsala, on 9 June 1980 and his last cap was at the age of 30, during the test match against Romania in Madrid, on 4 April 1992, earning 45 caps for Spain in aggregate.

Coaching career
After his retirement as player, he became a coach. Since then, great clubs from Madrid such as Liceo Francés, MARU (currently Alcobendas Rugby) and Complutense Cisneros were some of the teams he coached until his appointment for the Spanish national side, replacing the New Zealander Bryce Bevin. His highest goal is to bring Spain in a World Cup which the national team did not made to it since 1999. Despite his work as national coach, he is still a highly qualified physical education teacher at the  IES Antonio Machado.

Personal life
Although born in Madrid, Santos resides in Alcalá de Henares. He is cousin of the former Real Madrid football player Emilio Butragueño.

References

External links
Santiago Santos international stats at ESPN Scrum

1961 births
Sportspeople from Madrid
Spanish rugby union players
Spanish rugby union coaches
Rugby union hookers
Living people
Rugby union players from the Community of Madrid
Spanish expatriates in England